The Mount Lyell salamander (Hydromantes platycephalus) is a species of salamander in the family Plethodontidae. It is endemic to the Sierra Nevada of California, United States. It is found in a range of microhabitats, such as rock exposures, talus and rock fissures, and under rocks or in caves or crevices. No significant threats to this species are known.

References

Further reading
 Clark, H.O., Jr., and S.I. Hagen. 2008. Notes on a Mount Lyell Salamander observed near Nevada Falls, Yosemite National Park, California. Sonoran Herpetologist 21:122-123.

 Clark, H.O., Jr., and S.I. Hagen. 2016. Notes on a Mount Lyell Salamander observed near Nevada Falls, Yosemite National Park, California—Revisited ten years later. Sonoran Herpetologist 29:64.

Hydromantes
Amphibians of the United States
Endemic fauna of California
Rolling animals
Amphibians described in 1916
Taxonomy articles created by Polbot